Apamea gabrieli is a moth of the family Noctuidae. It was described in 2000 from a specimen collected in the San Gabriel Mountains near Big Pines in Los Angeles County, California. It is not named for the mountains themselves, but for their eponym, Gabriel. It is also known from the San Bernardino Mountains.

The wingspan is up to 48.5 millimeters. The forewings are brownish red and the hindwings are buff.

References

Apamea (moth)
Endemic fauna of California
Moths of North America
Moths described in 2000
Fauna without expected TNC conservation status